The UIC Flames women's basketball team represents the University of Illinois at Chicago in Chicago, Illinois, United States. The school's team currently competes in the Missouri Valley Conference.

History
UIC has (as of the end of the 2015–16 season) an all-time record of 823–951, with a 421–621 record in Division I play. The Flames have never reached the NCAA Tournament, but they have reached the WNIT in 2007 and the WBI in 2014, winning the WBI title that year.

Postseason

Women's National Invitation Tournament
The Flames have appeared in the Women's National Invitation Tournament once. They have a record of 0-1.

Women's Basketball Invitational
The Flames have appeared in the Women's Basketball Invitational twice. They were champions of the WBI in 2014. They have a record of 4-0.

References

External links